Conspiracy theories are a prevalent feature of culture and politics in Turkey. Conspiracism is an important phenomenon in understanding Turkish politics. This is explained by a desire to "make up for our lost Ottoman grandeur", the humiliation of perceiving Turkey as part of "the malfunctioning half" of the world, and a low level of media literacy among the Turkish population.

Prevalence

Roots and causes

Turkish author and journalist Mustafa Akyol describes the reason for the prevalence of conspiracy theorizing in Turkey as "it makes us feel important. If the world is conspiring against us, we must be really special. It is, I believe, the way we Turks make up for our lost Ottoman grandeur." Turkish economist Selim Koru has pointed to the humiliation of perceiving Turkey as part of the "malfunctioning [half]" of the world.

Turkish consumers are the second-most media illiterate when compared to countries in Europe, leaving them especially vulnerable to fake news, a 2018 report released by the Open Society Institute said. A combination of low education levels, low reading scores, low media freedom and low societal trust went into making the score, which saw Turkey being placed above only North Macedonia. According to the Reuters Institute Digital News Report 2018, Turkey with some distance is the country with most made-up news reports in the world.

Distinct features

A distinct feature of conspiracy theorizing in Turkey is that at the alleged command and control end of an alleged conspiracy scheme there are usually narrated to be state governments; this is due to an extreme state-centric worldview taught in the Turkish education system.

Doğan Gürpınar; a scholar whose areas of study include nationalism, historiography, and ideologies in Turkey; argues that conspiracism's power to shape intellectual discourse and ideological standpoints as well as represent the state tradition is unique to Turkey.

List of conspiracy theories
 Armenian genocide is invented: Turkish Armenian genocide denialists typically argue the academic consensus of it being a genocide as anti-Turkish propaganda or as a conspiracy spread by the Armenians, instead claiming that it either did not occur or that it was somehow justified at the time.
 COVID-19 misinformation: After the COVID-19 pandemic started in early 2020, false information regarding the virus's place of origin, treatment, diagnosis, etc. has been widely spread through social media, news outlets, and political biases. That caused an "infodemic," as dubbed by the World Health Organization. The numerous false claims regarding the treatment of the virus have caused harm on various fronts in the fight to subdue it. 
 Death of Özal: Some people believe that Turgut Özal, 8th president of Turkey, was assassinated in 1993. The main supporters of this theory are Özal's wife Semra Özal and their son Ahmet Özal. Retired brigadier-general Levent Ersöz was accused of the "assassination" and tried, but was found innocent and received an amnesty.

 Mastermind narrative: The term "mastermind" denotes the alleged command and control institution, somewhat ambiguously placed with the government of the United States, in a comprehensive conspiracy to weaken or even dismember Turkey. Erdoğan as well as the Daily Sabah have often alleged that very different non-state actors, like the Salafi jihadist Islamic State of Iraq and the Levant (ISIL), the Kurdistan Workers' Party (PKK) and the Islamist cult with political ambitions around Fethullah Gülen, were attacking Turkey at the same time in a well-coordinated campaign. Journalist Ömer Turan asserted that Netflix Turkey's teaser trailer for Money Heist contained messages aiming to incite the "second wave" of the Gezi Park protests.

 Anti-Israel: In the course of the 2006 Crimean–Congo hemorrhagic fever outbreak in Turkey, Felicity Party member Abdullah Uzun claimed that the tick species that spread the disease was brought to Turkey by Israeli female tourists. In May 2012, a dead European bee-eater with an Israeli leg-band, used by naturalists to track migratory birds, was found by villagers near the southeastern Turkish city of Gaziantep. The villagers worried that the bird may have carried a micro-chip from Israeli intelligence to spy on the area and alerted local officials. The head of the Agriculture and Livestock Provincial Directorate in Gaziantep, Akif Aslanpay, examined the corpse of the bee-eater and stated that he found that "the nose of the bird is very different and much lighter than others" and that it "can be used for audio and video," which, "in the case of Israel, they do." A counter-terrorism unit became involved before Turkey's agriculture ministry assured villagers that it is common to equip migratory birds with rings in order to track their movements. The BBC correspondent, Jonathan Head, ascribed the event to his view that "wildly implausible conspiracy theories take root easily in Turkey, with alleged Israeli plots among the most widely believed."

 War against Islam, also called the "War on Islam" or "Attack on Islam", is a conspiracy theory narrative in Islamism discourse to describe an alleged conspiracy to harm, weaken or annihilate the societal system of Islam, using military, economic, social and cultural means. The perpetrators of the conspiracy are alleged to be non-Muslims, particularly the Western world and "false Muslims", allegedly in collusion with political actors in the Western world. While the contemporary conspiracy theory narrative of the "War against Islam" mostly covers general issues of societal transformations in modernization and secularization, as well as general issues of international power politics among modern states, the Crusades, are often narrated as its alleged starting point. The English-language political neologism of "War on Islam" was coined in Islamist discourse in the 1990s and popularized as a conspiracy theory only after 2001.

 Treaty of Lausanne: It has been claimed in civil and formal circles that the Treaty of Lausanne will expire in 2023. According to the conspiracy theory, Turkey is forbidden to mine its natural resources (such as boron and petroleum) due to the "secret articles" of the treaty; therefore, Turkey will rapidly become a developed country by mining and exporting its resources once the treaty expires.
 Mustafa Kemal Atatürk: Various conspiracy theories against Atatürk, the founder of the Republic of Turkey, have been put forward by Islamist circles who did not support his secularist reforms. Kadir Mısıroğlu, known for his hatred of Atatürk, is behind many conspiracy theories about Atatürk. One of these conspiracy theories is that Anatolia was invaded by the Greeks as a result of Atatürk's agreement with the United Kingdom to overthrow the caliphate. Another conspiracy theory about Atatürk is that he was poisoned to death by the Freemasons due to the closure of Masonic lodges in Turkey in 1935. In 2015, Yeni Şafak claimed that İsmet İnönü was in charge of planning the murder.

See also
 American political conspiracy theories
 Deep state
 Deep state in Turkey
 Sèvres Syndrome
 Sun Language Theory

References

Further reading
 
 

 
Conspiracy theories involving Jews
Conspiracy theories involving Israel
Anti-Americanism
Politics of Turkey